Bobby Notkoff (31 December 1940 - 5 October 2018) was a violinist who played with The Rockets in the 1960s and Family Lotus in the 1970s. Notkoff was also part of one of the first supergroups Electric Flag, with Mike Bloomfield and Buddy Miles.

Selected discography
1967 The Trip [Original Soundtrack] - Electric Flag
1968 Long Time Comin''' - Electric Flag
1968 The Rockets (album) - The Rockets
1969 Everybody Knows This Is Nowhere - album by Neil Young with Crazy Horse.
1971 In My Own Time  album - Karen Dalton
1972 At Crooked Lake - Crazy Horse
1972 Sunset Ride - Zephyr
1972 For the Roses - Joni Mitchell
1978  Crazy Moon'' - Crazy Horse

References

1940 births
2018 deaths
American male violinists
21st-century American violinists
21st-century American male musicians